Bloomery is an unincorporated community in Hampshire County in the U.S. state of West Virginia. Bloomery is located along the Bloomery Pike (West Virginia Route 127), northwest of Winchester, Virginia. According to the 2000 census, the Bloomery community has a population of 321.

Bloomery was named for its one-time importance as a center of bloomeries for iron smelting. The first of Bloomery's iron furnaces was constructed in 1770. In 1814, a post office was established here.

Historic sites 
With the exception of the past two decades, the majority of Bloomery's residences were constructed prior to the American Civil War.

Bloomery Grist Mill (c. 1800), Bloomery Pike (WV Route 127)
Bloomery Presbyterian Church (1825), Bloomery Pike (WV Route 127)
Bloomery School, Sandy Hollow Road (County Route 45/1)
Fawcett House ("The Old Stone House"), Bloomery Pike (WV Route 127)
Hatch House, Smokey Hollow Road (County Route 6)
Old Bloomery Iron Furance, Bloomery Pike (WV Route 127)

References

External links

 Bloomery Was an Industrial Village

Unincorporated communities in Hampshire County, West Virginia
Unincorporated communities in West Virginia